The black-billed nightingale-thrush (Catharus gracilirostris) is a small thrush endemic to the highlands of Costa Rica and western Panama. Its position in the genus Catharus is somewhat equivocal, but it is apparently closer to the hermit thrush than to the other nightingale-thrushes except the russet nightingale-thrush and/or the ruddy-capped nightingale-thrush (Winker & Pruett, 2006).

It is found in the undergrowth of wet mountain oak forests and second growth, typically from above 1350 m altitude to patches of scrubbery beyond the timberline. The nest is a bulky lined cup constructed 1–5 m high in a scrub or small tree, and the typical clutch is 2 brown-blotched greenish-blue eggs.

The adult has olive- brown upperparts, a grey crown, paler grey underparts, becoming whitish on the belly, and an olive breast band. Its bill is black.

The juvenile is darker on the head and underparts, has a brown breast band, and the belly is marked with brown. The birds in the Chiriqui mountains of western Panama are slightly more rufous above and paler below than the Costa Rican population, and are sometimes considered as a subspecies, C. g. accentor.

The black-billed nightingale-thrush will normally forage low in vegetation or on the forest floor, alone on in pairs, progressing in hops and dashes with frequent stops. It turns leaf litter in typical thrush fashion seeking insects and spiders, and also eats many small fruits. Despite its habitat, this species is tame and often confiding.

The black-billed nightingale-thrush's song is up to three flute-like tones followed by a jumbled trill, and the call is a high thin seet.

References

Clement, Peter & Hathaway, Ren (2000): Thrushes. Christopher Helm, London. 
Stiles, F. Gary & Skutch, Alexander Frank (1989): A guide to the birds of Costa Rica. Comistock, Ithaca. 
Winker, Kevin & Pruett, Christin L. (2006): Seasonal migration, speciation, and morphological convergence in the avian genus Catharus (Turdidae). Auk 123(4): 1052–1068. [Article in English with Spanish abstract] DOI: 10.1642/0004-8038(2006)123[1052:SMSAMC]2.0.CO;2 PDF fulltext

black-billed nightingale-thrush
Birds of the Talamancan montane forests
black-billed nightingale-thrush
black-billed nightingale-thrush